Blues RFC (Invercargill) is an amateur rugby team that plays in the Premier Division of Southland Club Rugby. Founded in 1874, the club has a prestigious history, and it boasts 31 Galbraith Shield titles including a record period of 8 in a row. Blues has had  many All Blacks and NZ representatives  including their most recent All Black in Ethan De Groot and World Cup winning Black Fern Amy Rule along with NZ under 20 representatives Hayden Michaels 
and Jay Renton. Other All Black representatives in Elliot Dixon, joined by Simon Culhane and NZ representatives in David Henderson, Michael Fatialofa, Kendrick Lynn and James Wilson. Blues have a number notable current players which are competing for Southland Stags honours. The current backline is full of speed and power which compliments the strong forward pack.
Blues last won the Galbraith Shield beating Star 16 - 9 in the 2019 grand final.
Blues have a strong Women's Rugby squad who have won 4 titles from the past 5 competitions. Blues womens team have a wealth of youth along side some valuable experience and are set to maintain their incredible record during the 2023 season. 
Blues also have a strong Bs squad,  winning the 2018 season undefeated and current winners of the 2022 Division 2 competition. 
Blues Cs won the title in 2021 and both sides ensure depth across the board for Blues Rugby.

References
Southland Rugby Clubs

New Zealand rugby union teams
Sport in Invercargill
Rugby clubs established in 1874
1874 establishments in New Zealand
Organisations based in Invercargill